The Hohe Warte (318–493 m above NN) is a largely forested upland with four striking hills on the southwestern fringe of the Fichtelgebirge mountains located in northern Bavaria, near Bayreuth. Its highest peak is the Hirschberg (493 m). About 60% of the ridge lies on the territory of the parish of Bindlach, the other 40% is divided between the town of Bayreuth and the parish of Heinersreuth. A number of lakes and streams have their origin in these hills and are an important source of drinking water for the surrounding settlements.

Parishes 
To the north and east lies the hills are in the parish of Bindlach, in the south in the borough of Bayreuth, in the west on the parish of Heinersreuth.

The following villages lie on the hill range:

Peaks 
 Hirschberg (493 m above NN)
 Hohe Wart, Victory tower (Siegesturm)  (463 m ANN) - erected after the Franco-Prussian War of 1870/71
 Kühnleite  (457 m ANN)
 Schupfenschlager Höhe  (452 m ANN)

Rivers and lakes 

Rivers/streams:
 Hirschbach rises on the Hirschberg and flows into the Trebgast (White Main)
 Eisbach begins at the Eisbachsee and flows into the Trebgast
 Cottenbach begins at the Hirschbergsee and flows into the Red Main
 Altbach rises at the foot of the Schupfenschlager Höhe and flows into the Trebgast
Lakes:
 Eisbachsee
 Hirschbergsee
 Schupfenschlager Weiher

Crags

Tourism
The main tourist attraction in the region is the Victory Tower (Siegesturm) in Bayreuth, on the Hohe Warte. The eastern part is less popular. Almost the entire areas is a protected landscape. The ridge is also called the "Gateway to the Bavarian Northern Forests" (Tor zum Bayrischen Nortwald, the old name for the Franconian Forest and Fichtelgebirge mountains, because it was the first range of hills in the Fichtelgebirge from the valley of the Red Main. The Bavarian Nortwald hiking trail also begins at Hirschberg.

Economy 
The region is important for forestry, being used and maintained by the Bavarian State Forests.
The source region around the Hohe Wart is almost exclusively used to supply water to the town of Bayreuth and there is also an elevated drinking water reservoir.
East of the Hohe Warte lies the hospital named after it, the Klinik Hohe Warte

References

External links 
  View from the Hohe Warte
 The Fichtelgebirge

Hills of Bavaria
Mountains of the Fichtelgebirge